Pageview is a suburb of Johannesburg, South Africa. It is located in Region F of the City of Johannesburg Metropolitan Municipality. Populated by non-whites, predominantly Indians, until the 1970s, it was one of two adjacent suburbs (Pageview, and the portion of Vrededorp south of 11th Street populated by non-whites) commonly known as Fietas.

History 

In 1894, the land that would eventually become Pageview, was allocated by the South African Republic for Cape Coloureds (including Malays) and it became populated by Cape Malays. It was known as the Malay Camp (later Malay Location) with 279 stands. Coloureds had managed to obtain some concessions from the Boer government of Paul Kruger, possibly because they shared the Afrikaans language. Indians lived in the Coolie location, a slum west of the city, that was burned for sanitary reasons after an outbreak of bubonic plague in 1904. Most of the displaced Indians moved into the Malay Location, and by the 1940s was it mostly inhabited by Indian South Africans. On 27 January 1942, the Malay Location Standholders and Traders Association requested the name of the township be changed to Pageview after Johannesburg Mayor J.J Page. The town was renamed on 23 February 1943 and the council asked the government to give the Indian land owners ownership of their land. In 1948, the National Party won the election and would soon introduce Apartheid. The area would be declared a white area which meant the eviction of all non-white residents, with black residents going to Soweto and Indian residents to Lenasia with evictions continuing from 1964 to 1970. Many homes were bulldozed, and housing for white people was built on some of the land, with large parts remaining undeveloped. This heritage is now commemorated at the Fietas Museum.

The Oriental Plaza, a shopping centre, was built by the Johannesburg City Council to compensate the traders who lost the shops during the forced removals.

References

External links
A history of Fietas
 History and Founding of Lenasia 
 Fest celebrates all that is Fietas

Johannesburg Region F